This list includes castles and fortresses in Switzerland.

Entries list the name and location of the castle, fortress or ruins in each Canton in Switzerland.

Aargau

Appenzell Ausserrhoden

Appenzell Innerrhoden

Basel-Land

Basel-Stadt

Bern

Fribourg

Geneva

Glarus

Graubünden (Grisons)

Jura

Lucerne

Neuchâtel

Nidwalden

Obwalden

Schaffhausen

Schwyz

Solothurn

St. Gallen

Ticino

Thurgau

Uri

Vaud

Valais

Zug 

 Buonas Castle, Risch
 Freudenberg Castle, Risch-Rotkreuz
 Hünenberg Castle, Hünenberg
 St. Andreas Castle, Cham
 Wildenburg Castle (Zug), Baar
 Zug Castle, Zug

Zürich 

 Au Castle, Wädenswil
 Ruins of Baldern Castle, Stallikon
 Ruins of Oberes Baliken Castle, Wald
 Ruins of Bernegg Castle, Hinwil
 Ruins of Alt-Bichelsee Castle, Bichelsee
 Ruins of Breitenlandenberg Castle, Turbenthal
 Bubikon Castle, Bubikon
 Ruins of Dübelstein Castle, Dübendorf
 Eglisau Castle, Eglisau
 Elgg Castle, Elgg
 Flaach Castle, Flaach
 Ruins of Freienstein Castle, Freienstein - Teufen
 Ruins of Friedberg Castle, Meilen
 Ruins of Friesenberg Castle, Friesenberg, Zurich
 Girsberg Castle, Girsberg
 Ruins of Glanzenberg Castle, Unterengstringen
 Greifenberg Castle, Bäretswil
 Greifensee Castle, Greifensee
 Grüningen Castle, Grüningen
 Hegi Castle, Winterthur
 Ruins of Hohenlandenberg Castle, Wila
 Irgenhausen Castrum, Irgenhausen
 Kyburg Castle, Kyburg
 Ruins of Alt-Landenberg Castle, Bauma
 Ruins of Alt-Lägern Castle, Boppelsen
 Laufen Castle, Laufen-Uhwiesen
 Liebenberg Castle, Zell
 Mörsburg Castle, Stadel (Winterthur)
 Ruins of Alt-Regensberg Castle, Regensdorf
 Neu-Regensberg Castle, Regensberg
 Ruins of Schauenberg Castle, Turbenthal
 Ruins of Schnabelburg Castle, Hausen am Albis
 Schwandegg Castle, Waltalingen
 Ruins of Sünikon Castle, Steinmaur
 Ruins of Tössegg Castle, Wildberg und Turbenthal
 Ruins of Uetliburg Castle, Uetliberg
 Uster Castle, Uster
 Ruins of Alt Wädenswil Castle, Richterswil
 Wart Castle, Neftenbach
 Wiesendangen Castle, Wiesendangen
 Ruins of Alt-Wildberg Castle, Wildberg
 Ruins of Alt-Wülflingen Castle, Wülflingen in Winterthur
 Wülflingen Castle, Wülflingen in Winterthur
 Ruins of Wulp Castle, Küsnacht
 Wyden Castle, Ossingen

See also

 List of castles
 List of cathedrals in Switzerland
 List of museums in Switzerland
 Lists of tourist attractions in Switzerland

.
Castles
Switzerland
Switzerland
Castles and fortresses